Ellen Dubin is a Canadian actress. She is best known for her part in the television mini-series Lexx, playing the role of Giggerota.

From 2004 to 2006, Dubin starred in the TV series The Collector as Jeri Slate. She was nominated for a Gemini Award for this role. She also played a guest appearance role in Gene Roddenberry's Earth: Final Conflict as well as a number of other series.  In 2006 Dubin appeared in the TV movie The Wives He Forgot with Molly Ringwald and Mark Humphrey. In 2004 she appeared in Napoleon Dynamite.

Dubin is the spokesperson for the Make-a-Wish Foundation in Toronto and Central Ontario. She was married to Canadian media executive Jay Switzer until his death in 2018.

Filmography

Film

Television

Video games

Other

References

External links 

 Official Website
 Official Facebook page

Actresses from Toronto
Canadian film actresses
Canadian television actresses
Canadian video game actresses
Canadian voice actresses
Living people
Year of birth missing (living people)
20th-century Canadian actresses
21st-century Canadian actresses